This is a list of the songs that reached number one in Mexico in 1970, according to Billboard magazine with data provided by Radio Mil. Also included are the number-one songs according to the Record World magazine.

Chart history (Billboard)

By country of origin
Number-one artists:

Number-one compositions (it denotes the country of origin of the song's composer[s]; in case the song is a cover of another one, the name of the original composition is provided in parentheses):

Chart history (Record World)

See also
1970 in music

References

Sources
Print editions of the Billboard magazine from January 17, 1970 to December 19, 1970.

1970 in Mexico
Mexico
Lists of number-one songs in Mexico